Big Timber may refer to:

 Big Timber, Montana,  city and the county seat of Sweet Grass County, Montana
 Big Timber (1917 film)
 Big Timber (1950 film)
 Big Timber (TV series)